"What Russia Should Do with Ukraine", is an article written by  and published by the Russian state-owned news agency RIA Novosti. The article calls for the full destruction of Ukraine as a state and it also calls for the full destruction of the Ukrainian national identity in accordance with Russia's aim to accomplish the "denazification" of the latter. The article contrasts the views that Russian president Vladimir Putin expressed in the speech announcing the invasion, where he stated there were no plans to occupy Ukraine, and the Ukrainian people's right to self-determination would not be infringed upon.

It was published on 3 April 2022 in the context of the ongoing Russian invasion of Ukraine, on the same day as the bodies of dozens of civilians were discovered after the retreat of Russian forces from Ukrainian city of Bucha.

The article caused international criticism and outrage and has been condemned as evidence of genocidal intent.

Content 
The article advocates for "brutal censorship" of the Ukrainian culture, large-scale "de-ukrainization" of Ukrainians on the territories occupied by Russia in the 2022 invasion of Ukraine.

The author insists that Ukraine's ethnocentrism is an artificial perversion, that Ukraine's existence is "impossible" as a nation-state, and that the word "Ukraine" itself cannot be allowed to exist. According to the author, Ukraine should be dismantled and replaced with several states under direct control by Russia. He adds that the "ethnic component of self-identification" of Ukraine would also be rejected after its occupation by Russia.

The author claims that "most likely the majority" of Ukrainian civilians are "passive Nazis and Nazi accomplices. They supported the Nazi authorities and pandered to them", thus, they "technically" cannot be punished as war criminals, but can be subjected to "denazification" and are to blame. While Sergeytsev notes that there are no Nazi parties, symbols, racist laws, or other evidence of actual Nazism, he counters that by asserting that "Ukrainian Nazism is unique due to its amorphism and ambiguity", which is, per Timothy Snyder, equivalent to a "special Russian definition of Nazism". The author asserts that Banderites are actually marginal to "Ukro-nazism", and that the real menace is Pro-Europeanism.

He claims that Ukrainians must "assimilate the experience" of the war "as a historical lesson and atonement for [their] guilt". After the war, forced labor, imprisonment and the death penalty would be used as punishment. After that, the population would be "integrated" into "Russian civilization". The author describes the planned actions as a "decolonization" of Ukraine.

According to Anton Shekhovtsov, writing in Haaretz, the article is an expanded version of a 2016 article by Russian columnist Alexander Zhuchkovsky, who is linked to Russian Imperial Movement. In that article, Zhuchkovsky called for the dehumanization of Ukrainians, saying "It is natural and right, as we are fighting not against people but against enemies, [...] not against people but against Ukrainians."

Author 
The author of the text, advised Victor Pinchuk projects from 1998 to 2000, including Pinchuk's 1998 parliamentary election campaign in Ukraine, and was a member of the Board of Directors of Interpipe Group.

He was born in 1963. He studied at the Moscow Institute of Physics and Technology in 1980, where he was a student of Georgy Shchedrovitsky.

In 1999, he worked for the presidential campaign of then incumbent Ukrainian president Leonid Kuchma. In September 2004, he was a consultant to Viktor Yanukovych. In 2010, he worked with Arseniy Yatsenyuk. During Russia’s 2012 presidential elections, he worked as a consultant for Russian billionaire Mikhail Prokhorov and his party Right Cause. In 2012, Sergeitsev co-produced the Russian feature film Match which was criticized for Ukrainophobia. In 2014, it was banned on the territory of Ukraine as propaganda.

According to Der Tagesspiegel, Sergeitsev supports the (since 2015) pro-Putin political party "Civic Platform" financed by one of the oligarchs from Putin's inner circle. According to Euractiv, Sergeitsev is "one of the ideologists of modern Russian fascism".

Reactions

Domestic reaction 
Dmitry Medvedev, the current deputy chairman of the Security Council of Russia, as well as former president of Russia between 2008 and 2012 and former prime minister of Russia between 2012 and 2020, reiterated the main points of the article a few days after its publication. According to Medvedev, "a passionate segment of Ukrainian society has been praying to the Third Reich", Ukraine is a Nazi state like the Third Reich that must be "denazified" and "eradicated", and the result will be a collapse of Ukraine as a state. Medvedev claims that the collapse is a path towards "open Eurasia from Lisbon to Vladivostok". Medvedev has continued this rhetoric, posting lengthy diatribes against Ukraine aimed at domestic audiences. For example, in his "On Fakes and True History", he claimed that "the very essence of Ukrainianness, fed by anti-Russian venom and lies about its identity, is one big sham..."

On 26 April 2022, Putin's national security adviser Nikolai Patrushev said that "the Americans by using their proteges in Kyiv decided to create an antipode of our country, cynically choosing Ukraine for this, trying to divide an essentially single nation" and that "the result of the policy of the West and the Kyiv regime under its control can only be the disintegration of Ukraine into several states".

Russian opposition politician Leonid Gozman, former co-chairman of Right Cause, called Sergeytsev a "scumbag". Andrei Kolesnikov, a political analyst at Carnegie Moscow Center, said that consultants like Sergeytsev can be used to create strategies for authorities but they "don’t have any serious influence on anything".

International reactions 

President of Ukraine Volodymyr Zelenskyy said that the article is proof of the Russian Federation's plans to carry out a genocide of Ukrainian citizens. He noted that in order to denote the genocide of Ukrainians in the article the terms "de-Ukrainisation" and "de-Europeanization" were used. In his opinion, this is a part of the evidence for a future tribunal against Russian war crimes in Ukraine.

According to a representative of Ukraine at Russian-Ukrainian peace negotiations Mykhailo Podoliak, the article is an official call for mass murders of Ukrainians because of their ethnicity, and will be considered as such by international criminal courts. The Minister of Culture and Information Policy of Ukraine Oleksandr Tkachenko commented:

The head of the Latvian Ministry of Foreign Affairs Edgars Rinkēvičs called the article "ordinary fascism". Former Canadian ambassador to Ukraine Roman Waschuk said that "It's essentially a rhetorical 'licence to kill' Ukrainians."

Slavoj Žižek called the article "mad ravings" and noted that "Western imperial powers' brutal exploitation of the Global South is a truth that must never be forgotten. But it is strange to hear such talk from Russia, with its long history of such behavior... Now, we are told that Kazakhstan, Azerbaijan, Georgia, and Ukraine will be "decolonized" by way of... Russian colonization. Territories will be liberated against the will of their people (who will have to be re-educated or otherwise dissolved)" and that "if a new world war is to be avoided, it will be through a "hot peace," with massive military investments sustaining a fragile new balance of power."

Legal 
In Germany in April, Bundestag deputy Thomas Heilmann has filed a lawsuit with the Berlin prosecutor against the author of the article. According to Heilmann, the article may be a violation of the Convention on the Prevention and Punishment of Genocide.

In Ukraine in May, the Ukrainian Prosecutor General's Office opened a pre-trial investigation in the case.

The death penalty is forbidden under both Russian and Ukrainian law, . On the 8 July 2022, a month after it sentenced three prisoners of war to death, the DPR lifted a moratorium on the death penalty.

Criticism 
According to Mika Aaltola, director of the Finnish Institute of International Affairs, the article showed Russian war propaganda "developing in a worrying direction".

According to Latvia-based Russian media Meduza, the article is "essentially a blueprint for the genocide" of Ukrainians.

According to Oxford expert on Russian affairs Samuel Ramani, the article "represents mainstream Kremlin thinking".

The American historian Timothy Snyder wrote that the text "advocates the elimination of the Ukrainian people as such". He later noted that it uses a special definition of the word "Nazi": "a Nazi is a Ukrainian who refuses to admit being a Russian". In his opinion, the article reveals the genocidal intent of Russia.

Slavoj Žižek wrote: "So, Russia plans to do with Ukraine what Bertolt Brecht describes in his 1953 poem "The Solution": dissolve the people and elect another. By reading Sergeytsev's mad ravings alongside Putin's claim that Lenin invented Ukraine, we can discern the current Russian position. Ukraine has two fathers: Lenin, who invented it, and Hitler, who inspired today's “ukronazis” to actualize Lenin's invention... Now, we are told that Kazakhstan, Azerbaijan, Georgia, and Ukraine will be “decolonized” by way of... Russian colonization. Territories will be liberated against the will of their people (who will have to be re-educated or otherwise dissolved). If a new world war is to be avoided, it will be through a “hot peace,” with massive military investments sustaining a fragile new balance of power. The fragility of the situation stems not just from conflicting economic interests but also from conflicting interpretations of reality, which is not just about settling facts. But simply trying to prove that Russian claims are false misses the point made by Aleksandr Dugin, Putin's court philosopher: “Post-modernity shows that every so-called truth is a matter of believing. So we have our special Russian truth that you need to accept.” Faith, it seems, overrides knowledge. According to the “special Russian truth,” Russia's soldiers left behind no corpses of brutalized civilians in Bucha and other Ukrainian cities and towns; Western propagandists supposedly staged those atrocities. Given these circumstances, Westerners must stop proposing that Zelensky meet with Putin to negotiate a peace settlement... Any eventual negotiations will have to be conducted by lower-level bureaucrats. Putin and his inner circle are criminals who must be ignored as much as possible".

For the French emeritus lecturer in contemporary history and specialist in the Soviet Union, Françoise Thom, indicates that the exposed plan, far from being a simple war, aims in reality to carry out the liquidation of the Ukrainian nation by Russification of its population.

She demonstrates that the territory of the ex-Ukraine state will be divided into popular republics on the models of Donetsk and Luhansk. The use of forced labour as indicated in the program means the re-establishment of the organisation of gulags on Ukrainian territory.

She also analyzes in the first months of the invasion of Ukraine the different measures created as the episodes of mass terror, the systematic rapt and detention of local political elites of the towns, deportation of women and children to Russia, the creation of filtration camps to filter Ukrainian people compatible with Russian ideology. She demonstrates that it is not a question of atrocities or exactions due to the Russian military, but on the contrary the deliberate implementation of a policy of re-education by terror of the Ukrainian people.

Thom also writes that the creation of a Russian agency of denazification inside the global structure of the Rossotrudnichestvo (Federal Agency for the Commonwealth of Independent States Affairs, Compatriots Living Abroad, and International Humanitarian Cooperation) means total political control by  Russia of Ukraine and a definitive and complete loss of independence and sovereignty for this one.

She also underlines that the thesis supported by Timofeï Sergeïtsev according to which the "brother people" of Ukraine would be victims of oppression of a Nazi power installed in Kiev and supported by the West only asked to rise up as soon as Russia allegedly extending a helping hand is in truth belied by the facts and demonstrated by the reality of intense Ukrainian resistance.

Finally, she analyzes that Timofei Sergeyitsev associates "Nazism" and "Europeanism". The parallel "de-Europeanization" of Ukraine and Russia is only a prologue, as Russian political scientist Vladimir Mojegov suggests, which is really aimed at all of Europe: "Our goal in Ukraine is not to displace the anti-Russian focus 1,000 km to the west, but to create on our western borders a bridge and a springboard towards a new Europe, not towards the current Europe of chaos and decadence, but towards the Europe of Tradition.

See also 
 "On the Historical Unity of Russians and Ukrainians", 2021 essay by Vladimir Putin
 "On conducting a special military operation", 2022 speech by Putin
 "Where have you been for eight years?" a phrase used during the 2022 Russian invasion of Ukraine
 "Address concerning the events in Ukraine", 2022 speech by Putin 
 Russian imperialism
 Russian nationalism
 Rashism
 Bucha massacre
 Claims of genocide of Ukrainians in the 2022 Russian invasion of Ukraine
 War crimes in the 2022 Russian invasion of Ukraine
 Krasovsky case

Notes

References

External links
 'A chance for revenge': The rise and fall of ‘methodology,’ the school of thought that produced the idea of the 'Russian world' - article by Meduza with short biography of Sergeytsev
 

2022 in international relations
2022 works
Anti-Ukrainian sentiment in Russia
April 2022 events in Europe
Ethnic cleansing
Genocides in Europe
Historical revisionism
Incitement to genocide
Nazi analogies
Newspaper articles
Propaganda in Russia related to the 2022 Russian invasion of Ukraine
Russia–Ukraine relations
Russian irredentism